Eustace is a city in Henderson County, Texas, United States. The population was 991 at the 2010 census, up from 798 at the 2000 census.

History

Fire From Below
In November 2007, film crews led by actor/producer Andrew Stevens came to Eustace to film a movie called Fire from Below. The cast included Kevin Sorbo (Hercules) and Burton Gilliam (Blazing Saddles). Many Eustace locations were used, including a restaurant and gazebo on the town square, and a nearby private lake (dubbed "Lost Lake" in the film). Several Eustace residents were used as extras. According to the script, "Eustace" was retained as the name of the town setting depicted in the scenes shot in Eustace. Fire from Below was released in 2009.

2017 tornado
On April 29, 2017, a very large and destructive EF4 tornado struck the city of Eustace causing major damage. The tornado then tore through West Canton, where more possible EF3/EF4 damage occurred. No deaths were reported in this event, but Canton was devastated only minutes later by another tornado (rated EF3) which killed four people.

2021 Gas leak
On November 12, 2021, a Gas leak that was caused by stress to a gas line started a town evacuation. The gas leak started in the morning, and a smell was noticed by many Eustace residents. In the afternoon, mayor received a message saying it was a leak of a toxic gas. Many residents flew to towns nearby, such as Athens and Mabank. Later in the very early morning, mayor declared Eustace was back to normal.

Geography

Eustace is located in northwestern Henderson County at  (32.308801, –96.009098). U.S. Route 175 passes through the center of town, leading southeast  to Athens, the county seat, and northwest  to Mabank.

Demographics

As of the census of 2000, there were 798 people, 309 households, and 204 families residing in the city. The population density was 463.9 people per square mile (179.1/km2). There were 339 housing units at an average density of 197.1 per square mile (76.1/km2). The racial makeup of the city was 97.87% White, 0.13% Native American, 0.13% Asian, 1.38% from other races, and 0.50% from two or more races. Hispanic or Latino of any race were 5.39% of the population.

There were 309 households, out of which 36.9% had children under the age of 18 living with them, 48.5% were married couples living together, 12.0% had a female householder with no husband present, and 33.7% were non-families. 29.4% of all households were made up of individuals, and 18.1% had someone living alone who was 65 years of age or older. The average household size was 2.58 and the average family size was 3.20.

In the city, the population was spread out, with 29.8% under the age of 18, 9.1% from 18 to 24, 29.9% from 25 to 44, 15.5% from 45 to 64, and 15.5% who were 65 years of age or older. The median age was 34 years. For every 100 females, there were 90.5 males. For every 100 females age 18 and over, there were 79.5 males.

The median income for a household in the city was $40,045, and the median income for a family was $42,411. Males had a median income of $37,500 versus $21,435 for females. The per capita income for the city was $17,419. About 6.6% of families and 10.4% of the population were below the poverty line, including 11.9% of those under age 18 and 6.7% of those age 65 or over.

Education 
Students are zoned in the Eustace Independent School District.

References

External links
 City of Eustace official website
 

Cities in Texas
Cities in Henderson County, Texas
U.S. Route 175